Attorney General Cross may refer to:

Eric William Blake Cross (1904–1965), Attorney General of Ontario
James Albert Cross (1876–1952), Attorney-General of Saskatchewan

See also
General Cross (disambiguation)